Edward Bland (died ca. 1653) was an English explorer and merchant.

Bland was born in England to John and Susan Bland and was one of several children. He was baptized on February 5, 1614 in the Saint Stephen Coleman Street parish. Around 1634 Bland married his cousin Jane Bland, the daughter of his uncle, Gregory Bland. They had one child together, Edward. He was sent to Virginia in about 1646, by his older brother, John, to look after the family's land and mercantile interests there, following the death of their younger brother Adam. Once there he began to acquire more land and by 1652 owned a substantial amount on both sides of the James River.

During the summer of 1650 Bland accompanied Abraham Wood, Sackford Brewster, Elias Pennant, and an Appamattoc guide named Pyancha on an expedition of lands to the south of Virginia. The group hoped to travel up the Roanoke River and surpass the terrain explored by Ralph Lane, but were unsuccessful. Bland kept a record of the journey, which marked the first time that the Occaneechi tribe was mentioned in the English historical record. He also kept notes of the land, vegetation, and other landmarks. The group is believed to have traveled as far as Roanoke Rapids, North Carolina, an area that Bland dubbed "New Brittaine". Upon his return he published a pamphlet entitled The Discovery of New Brittaine and successfully petitioned the General Assembly to colonize the area.

Bland died around 1653, likely in his home. Shortly thereafter his brother Theodorick Bland travelled to Virginia to assume control of the family's interests.

References

External links
 The Discovery of New Brittaine at the Internet Archive

Bland family of Virginia
Businesspeople from London
English emigrants